Mo Zhi Hong (born 1973 Singapore) is a New Zealand novelist. His parents were the people of Chinese Singaporean descent. His book, The Year of the Shanghai Shark, won the 2009 Commonwealth Writers' Prize, best first book, South East Asia and South Pacific.

Works
The Year of the Shanghai Shark, Penguin, 2008,

References

External links
2010 SILF: Liveblogging with Mo Zhihong 
Mo Zhi Hong’s The Year of the Shanghai Shark, Literary Minded, Angela Meyer, September 29, 2009

21st-century New Zealand novelists
New Zealand people of Chinese descent
Singaporean emigrants to New Zealand
1973 births
Living people